On 22 February 2018, a Serbian-born man threw an explosive grenade inside the embassy of the United States in Podgorica, the capital of Montenegro. He then blew himself up outside the compound with another explosive. The attack occurred around midnight when the embassy was closed, and nobody was wounded. Russian authorities denied any involvement.

Perpetrator
Dalibor Jauković was born in 1976 in Kraljevo, Serbia, and formerly served in the Yugoslav Army. He was a veteran of the Kosovo War. The U.S. State Department noted that Jauković was opposed to Montenegro's membership of NATO (Montenegro joined in 2017).

See also
Montenegrin coup plot
Montenegro–NATO relations

References

2018 in Montenegro 
2018 crimes in Montenegro 
Attacks in Europe in 2018
Attacks in Montenegro
Attacks on diplomatic missions of the United States
February 2018 crimes in Europe
Montenegro–United States relations
Suicides in Europe